The Arrondissement of Soignies is one of the seven administrative arrondissements in the Walloon province of Hainaut, Belgium.

The Arrondissement of Soignies consists of the following municipalities:

Since 2019
 Braine-le-Comte
 Écaussinnes
 Le Rœulx
 Manage
 Soignies
 Seneffe

Before 2019
 Braine-le-Comte
 Écaussinnes
 Enghien
 La Louvière
 Le Roeulx
 Lessines
 Silly
 Soignies

The municipalities of Enghien, Lessines and Silly are transferred on January 1, 2019 to the Arrondissement of Ath while the municipalities of Manage and Seneffe from the Arrondissement of Charleroi are integrated on the same date into the Arrondissement of Soignies. La Louvière is detached from the Arrondissement on the same date to create the new Arrondissement of La Louvière.

References

Soignies